Industrial and Commercial Bank was a bank in Hong Kong, established in 1917. Under the leadership of its general manager, Xue Xianzhou, after 1919, its business was focused on operating money remittances of Overseas Chinese and its branches were extended to Guangzhou, Hankou, Shanghai, and Tianjin. However, the bank was closed down in 1930 after Xue's death and losing in foreign currency business.

A new bank with a similar name, the Hong Kong Industrial and Commercial Bank, was re-established in 1964. In 1987, it was acquired by Dah Sing Bank. In 1994, its 40% interest was acquired by China Construction Bank and it was renamed to Jian Sing Bank. In 2002, Jian Sing Bank was totally acquired by China Construction Bank and renamed to China Construction Bank (Asia) Limited.

See others 
China Construction Bank (Asia)

References

Banks established in 1917
Banks disestablished in 1930
Banks established in 1964
Defunct banks of Hong Kong
China Construction Bank
Banks disestablished in 1994
1917 establishments in Hong Kong
1930 disestablishments in Hong Kong
1964 establishments in Hong Kong
1994 disestablishments in Hong Kong